Eastcombe is a village in Stroud District in Gloucestershire, England.

The Parish Church is called Eastcombe: St Augustine and served the parish of Bussage with Eastcombe and the benefice of Bisley, Chalford, France Lynch and Oakridge and Bussage with Eastcombe and belongs to the diocese of Gloucester. It was announced in November 2021 that the church would be closed and the building sold.

Eastcombe is situated in the South West (England) region of the UK and is governed by Stroud District Council.

The village of Eastcombe is in the Gloucestershire region of Gloucestershire, Wiltshire and Bath/Bristol area within South West (England).

Thomas Keble School is a secondary school located in the village.

References

Stroud District
Villages in Gloucestershire